AA-1 or AA1 may refer to:

 , a United States Navy submarine also known as USS AA-1
 K-5 (missile), an early Soviet air-to-air missile, NATO reporting name AA-1 'Alkali'
 Grumman American AA-1, a light aircraft
 PRR AA1, a Pennsylvania Railroad electric locomotive
 Phoenix Wright: Ace Attorney, a video game
 Acer Aspire One, a netbook computer
 American Airlines Flight 1 (disambiguation), various flights
 Aa1 is the second highest credit rating given by Moody's Investors Service
 Bavarian AA I, a steam locomotive
 1997 AA1, the alternate name for 8735 Yoshiosakai, an outer main-belt asteroid
 Gardiner's designated symbol for the hieroglyph that represents a sieve or placenta: Aa1